Lejja is a community comprising 33 villages in Enugu State of South-Eastern Nigeria. It is populated by the Igbo people and located about 14 Kilometers from Nsukka. It is the location of a prehistoric archaeological site which contains iron smelting furnaces and slag dated to 2000 BC. The village square at Otobo ugwu which is likely the first village square in Lejja contains over 800 blocks of slag with an average weight of between 34 and 57 kg. Geophysical investigations have located buried iron slag in several other locations in the community.

Further reading 
Museums, archaeologists and indigenous people: archaeology and the public in Nigeria
IRON TECHNOLOGY AND POLITICAL POWER: EXAMPLES FROM THE IRON SMELTING BELT OF NSUKKA AREA, ENUGU STATE, SOUTH-EASTERN NIGERIA by CHIDOZIE S. AGU and CHUKWUMA, C. OPATA, UNIVERSITY OF NIGERIA, NSUKKA

See also 
Opi (archaeological site)
Archaeology of Igbo-Ukwu

External links 
Lejja, iron smelting kingdom

References

Archaeological sites in Nigeria
Archaeological sites of Western Africa